Okechukwu Orlando Okoroha (born March 8, 1990) is an American football defensive back for the Nebraska Danger of the Indoor Football League (IFL). He first enrolled at Boston College before transferring to the Marshall University. He attended Eleanor Roosevelt High School in Greenbelt, Maryland. Okoroha has also been a member of the Portland Thunder of the Arena Football League (AFL).

Early years
Okoroha played high school football for the Eleanor Roosevelt High School Raiders. He earned Prince George's 4A, Gazette All-County and Maryland Big School All-State honorable mention honors his senior year in 2007. He recorded 70 tackles, including four sacks, in seven games his senior season while missing three games due to an ankle injury. Okoroha also recorded four interceptions, three pass breakups, two forced fumbles, one fumble recover and an 82-yard kickoff return for a touchdown.

College career
Okoroha played for the Boston College Eagles from 2008 to 2010. He appeared in 21 total games for the Eagles, recording 34 tackles, and made six starts in 2010. He was dismissed from the team before the start of the 2011 season for failing a drug test.

Okoroha transferred to play for the Marshall Thundering Herd in 2012, recording 108 tackles, four pass breakups, three tackles for loss and a fumble recovery.

Professional career
Okoroha signed with the AFL's Portland Thunder on July 10, 2014. He played in one game for the Thunder during the 2014 season, recording 1.5 tackles. He played in six games for the team in 2015, recording 29 tackles, two fumble recoveries and two pass breakups. Okoroha became a free agent after the 2015 season.

He signed with the Nebraska Danger of the IFL on March 16, 2016.

References

External links
Just Sports Stats
College stats
IFL stats

Living people
1990 births
Players of American football from Maryland
American football defensive backs
Nigerian players of American football
Boston College Eagles football players
Marshall Thundering Herd football players
Portland Thunder players
Nebraska Danger players
Sportspeople from Lagos
People from Lanham, Maryland